Waterford Intermediate Hurling Championship is a second-tier hurling competition organised by the Waterford Board of the Gaelic Athletic Association. The winning club progresses to the senior grade the following year for the Waterford Senior Hurling Championship. The winning club also represents Waterford GAA in the Munster Intermediate Club Hurling Championship. Each of the two divisions of Waterford GAA - East Division and West Division - organises its own competition, with the two winners contesting the county final.

Qualification for subsequent competitions

Munster Intermediate Club Hurling Championship
The Waterford IHC winners qualify for the Munster Intermediate Club Hurling Championship. It is the only team from County Waterford to qualify for this competition. The Waterford IHC winners enter the Munster Intermediate Club Hurling Championship at the __ stage. For example, 2014 winner Cappoquin won the Munster IHC, as did 2016 winner Lismore.

All-Ireland Intermediate Club Hurling Championship
The Waterford IHC winners — by winning the Munster Intermediate Club Hurling Championship — may qualify for the All-Ireland Intermediate Club Hurling Championship, at which they would enter at the __ stage. For example, 2016 Waterford IHC winner Lismore contested the All-Ireland Championship and, in a game played at Tullamore, County Offaly (neutral territory), were unexpectedly knocked out by eventual champions Ahascragh-Fohenagh (featuring Cathal and Pádraic Mannion, who won the All-Ireland Senior Hurling Championship with Galway).

Roll of honour

References

External links
 http://www.waterford-news.ie/2013/10/15/prendergast-points-ardmore-back-senior-ranks/
 http://www.munster-express.ie/sports/gaa-hurling/dunhill-return-to-top-grade-by-slenderest-of-margins/
 http://www.roanmoregaaclub.com/gallery_185530.html
 http://www.munster-express.ie/community-notes/dungarvan/county-intermediate-hurling-final/
 http://www.waterfordgaa.ie/gallery/6304/Co_Intermediate_Hurling_Final_Dungarvan_V_Clonea
 http://www.munster-express.ie/page/5/?s=molleran
 http://www.munster-express.ie/sports/gaa-hurling/passage-the-victors-in-epic-intermediate-final/
 http://archive.bebo.com/Blog.jsp?MemberId=4954983189
 http://munster.gaa.ie/2012/11/10/aib-munster-gaa-hurling-intermediate-club-championship-semi-final-ballyduff-or-lixnaw-kerry-v-winners-of-cork-v-limerick-representatives/
 http://www.munster-express.ie/sports/gaa-hurling/eastern-intermediate-hurling-championship/
 http://www.munster-express.ie/sports/gaa-hurling/abbeyside-may-be-team-to-beat/
 http://www.ardmoregaa.org/about-us/our-history/126-the-roots-of-st-declans-gaa-club-ardmore
 http://www.munster-express.ie/sports/gaa-hurling/senior-hurling-championship-reconvenes/
 http://www.waterford-news.ie/2014/10/14/cappoquin-end-24-year-wait-senior-return/

Intermediate hurling county championships
2